The term war in South Ossetia may refer to:
 Georgian–Ossetian conflict (1918–1920)
 1991–1992 South Ossetia War
 2008 Russo-Georgian War

See also 
 Georgian–Ossetian conflict